Jeremy Brown (born 1979) is an American former baseball player.

Jeremy Brown may also refer to:

Jeremy Brown (footballer) (born 1977), New Zealand former footballer
Jeremy Brown/Mr Brown, the English teacher in Mind Your Language
Jeremy Brown, late guitarist of Scott Weiland and the Wildabouts

See also
Jeremy Browne (disambiguation)
Jerry Brown (disambiguation)